"Hope & Glory" is a song recorded by Swedish singer Måns Zelmerlöw. It was released on 1 March 2009 in Sweden. It was released as the lead (second overall) single from his second studio album MZW (2009). The song served as his Melodifestivalen 2009 entry coming eventual 4th place behind Malena Ernman, Caroline af Ugglas and E.M.D. respectively.

History
On November 18, 2008 it was announced that Måns Zelmerlöw would, for the second time, compete in Melodifestivalen, Sweden's process to decide their Eurovision entry for that year. Måns entered with the song "Hope & Glory", co written by himself and Fredrik Kempe with music by Kempe and Henrik Wikström. Måns competed in the second semi final in Skellefteå on February 14, 2009 where he won first place after winning both rounds from this he progressed to the final in Stockholm where he came 4th with 144 combined points, Hope & Glory received the most points from the jury. The single was released digitally on February 25, 2009 one week before the album MZW and eventually peaked at number 1 on the official Swedish charts.

Track listings

Chart performance
The single debuted at number 22 on the Swedish Singles Chart but climbed to number 2 after the physical release in March 2009.

Weekly charts

Year-end charts

Release history

References

2009 singles
Dance-pop songs
Melodifestivalen songs of 2009
Warner Music Group singles
Songs written by Henrik Wikström
Songs written by Fredrik Kempe
Måns Zelmerlöw songs
Songs written by Måns Zelmerlöw
2009 songs
English-language Swedish songs